Queensland, being the second largest (by area) state in Australia, is also the most decentralised. Hence the highways and roads cover most parts of the state unlike the sparsely populated Western Australia. Even Queensland's outback is well served as it is relatively populated.

Road quality varies from 8-laned Pacific Motorway linking Brisbane–Gold Coast to earth-packed outback tracks, reflecting the great diversity of its terrain and climatic conditions. The route markings are also unique in the sense that Queensland uses all available schemes, from old-style National Route scheme and the blue-shielded State Route scheme to the latest alphanumeric numbering scheme and the Metroads metropolitan route numbering scheme.

National Land Transport Network

Bruce Highway
 Gateway Motorway
Pacific Motorway
 Bruce Highway

Gateway Motorway
Ipswich Motorway
Logan Motorway
Warrego Highway

 Barkly Highway
 Landsborough Highway
 Warrego Highway
 Flinders Highway
 Ipswich Motorway

Cunningham Highway
New England Highway
 Gore Highway

State highways

 Captain Cook Highway
 Gulf Developmental Road
 Kennedy Highway
 Savannah Way
 Gold Coast Highway

Gympie Arterial Road
Pacific Motorway
Riverside Expressway

Burnett Highway
D'Aguilar Highway
New England Highway
 Isis Highway
 Scenic Highway (Queensland)
 Port of Brisbane Motorway
 Capricorn Highway

Centenary Motorway
Legacy Way
Western Freeway, Brisbane
 Leichhardt Highway
 David Low Way

Carnarvon Highway
Dawson Highway
Gregory Highway
Ipswich Road
 Fitzroy Developmental Road
 Maroochydore Road
 Suttor Developmental Road
 Mount Lindesay Highway

Brisbane Valley Highway
D'Aguilar Highway
 Palmerston Highway
 Burke Developmental Road
 Mulligan Highway
 Cunningham Highway
 Captain Cook Highway
 Carnarvon Highway

Balonne Highway
Bunya Highway
Moonie Highway
Wide Bay Highway

Gillies Highway
Isis Highway

Carnarvon Highway
Castlereagh Highway
 Dawson Highway
 Kennedy Developmental Road
 Gregory Developmental Road
 Fitzroy Developmental Road
 
Peak Downs Highway
Sunshine Motorway
 Mitchell Highway
 Bowen Developmental Road

Mulligan Highway
Peninsula Developmental Road
 
Boulia Mount Isa Highway
Burke Developmental Road
Diamantina Developmental Road
Eyre Developmental Road
 Wills Developmental Road

Barwon Highway
Brisbane Valley Highway
D'Aguilar Highway
Esk–Hampton Road
Gore Highway
Leichhardt Highway
New England Highway
 Surat Developmental Road
 D'Aguilar Highway
 - Toowoomba-Athol Road
 No shield
Donohue Highway

Outback track

 Bamaga Road (Telegraph Road)
 Birdsville Track

See also

 Highways in Australia for highways in other states and territories
 List of highways in Australia for roads named as highways, and roads that function as highways but are not necessarily classified as highways
 List of road routes in Queensland

External links

 
Highways in Queensland
Queensland
 
Highways